The RCMP Heritage Centre is a law enforcement museum located in Regina, Saskatchewan, Canada. The museum houses a number of exhibits on the Royal Canadian Mounted Police (RCMP) and artifacts relating to the police force. The heritage centre's  was designed by Nick Milkovich Architects, and is situated in the northeast end of RCMP Academy, Depot Division.

Construction for the RCMP Heritage Centre began in 2005 to replace the RCMP Centennial Museum, also located at Depot Division. The RCMP Heritage Centre was officially opened to the public in May 2007.

History
The first museum on the Royal Canadian Mounted Police, the RCMP Centennial Museum, was opened to the public in 1933. Situated at RCMP Academy, Depot Division in Regina, Saskatchewan, the Centennial Museum was later closed to the public in October 2006. The RCMP Heritage Centre was established in order to replace the Centennial Museum, with its collections relocated to the Heritage Centre following its completion.

Construction for the RCMP Heritage Centre began in 2005. The facility was officially opened to the public on 23 May 2007.

Architecture
Completed in 2007, the building was estimated to have cost C$40 million. Nick Milkovich Architects was the design architect for the project, with Arthur Erickson serving as a design consultant for the building; P3 Architects served as the architect of record for the project. Construction of the building was contracted to PCL Construction.

Building materials used for the construct the heritage centre includes concrete, glass, Tyndall stone, and limestone quarried from Manitoba. The massing of the building was designed to appear like it is sinking and rising into the landscape. The building's roof resembles windblown snow, or encampments used by the First Nations and North-West Mounted Police during the 19th century.

The interior of the building features coloured concrete floors, with metal ceilings. The building also includes a 124-seat lecture hall/theatre.

Exhibitions

The heritage centre's main gallery holds a permanent exhibition that explore the history of the force, or exhibits practices in forensics. Exhibits in the main gallery includes Creating a Mounted Police, Maintaining Law and Order in the West, Protecting the North, Serving all of Canada, Preserving the Tradition, and Cracking the Case. The heritage centre "Feature Exhibition" is situated in a different hall, and exhibits specialty items from its collection for a limited time. A number of the items in the institution's collection originates from the collections of the defunct RCMP Centennial Museum. 

Beginning in 2016, the museum also began to operate interactive virtual reality exhibits.

See also
 List of museums in Saskatchewan

References

External links

 

Museums in Regina, Saskatchewan
Royal Canadian Mounted Police
Law enforcement museums in Canada
Arthur Erickson buildings
2007 establishments in Saskatchewan